The Copa LP Chile is a tournament for professional female tennis players played on outdoor clay courts. The event is classified as a $115,000 WTA 125 tournament and is as per 2022 held at Hacienda Chicureo in Colina, Chile. Prior to 2022, the tournaments used to be a part of ITF Women's Circuit. The 2021 edition of the tournament, by exception, took place at the Club Palestino in Santiago. Earlier editions were also based in Colina.

Past finals

Singles

Doubles

External links 
 ITF search
 Official website 

ITF Women's World Tennis Tour
Clay court tennis tournaments
Tennis tournaments in Chile
Recurring sporting events established in 2017